This is a list of historic places in Golden Horseshoe, the region of Ontario on the northwestern and western shores of Lake Ontario. It contains heritage sites listed on the Canadian Register of Historic Places (CRHP), all of which are designated as historic places either locally, provincially, territorially, nationally, or by more than one level of government. The following areas have been separated out due to their many listings:

Regional Municipality of Niagara
Regional Municipality of Peel
Toronto
Regional Municipality of York

List of historic places in other parts of the region

Regional Municipality of Durham

Regional Municipality of Halton

Hamilton

See also

List of historic places in Ontario
List of National Historic Sites of Canada in Ontario

References

Golden Horseshoe